The 2007 Colonial Athletic Association baseball tournament was held at Brooks Field in Wilmington, North Carolina, from May 23 through 26.  The event determined the champion of the Colonial Athletic Association for the 2007 season.  Third-seeded VCU won the tournament for the fourth time and earned the CAA's automatic bid to the 2007 NCAA Division I baseball tournament.

Entering the event, former member East Carolina had won the most championships, with seven.  Among active members, Old Dominion and VCU led with three titles while George Mason and UNC Wilmington had won twice each and William & Mary had won once.

Format and seeding
The top six teams from the CAA's round-robin regular season qualified for the tournament.  Teams were seeded by conference winning percentage.  The top four seeds were awarded by tiebreakers as VCU, Old Dominion, Delaware, and UNC Wilmington all finished with the same record in conference.  George Mason earned the fifth seed by tiebreaker over Georgia State, as the Patriots and Panthers had the same conference winning percentage.  They played a double-elimination tournament.

Bracket and results

All-Tournament Team
The following players were named to the All-Tournament Team.

Most Valuable Player
John Leonard was named Tournament Most Valuable Player.  Leonard was a pitcher and outfielder for VCU.

References

Tournament
Colonial Athletic Association Baseball Tournament
Colonial Athletic Association baseball tournament
Colonial Athletic Association baseball tournament
College baseball tournaments in North Carolina
Baseball competitions in Wilmington, North Carolina